Zophosis, known generally as frantic surface beetles is a genus of darkling beetles in the family Tenebrionidae. They are found in the Palearctic, tropical Africa, and Indomalaya.

References

External links

 

Tenebrionoidea